The Hyundai Tucson (pronounced Tu-són) is a compact crossover SUV produced by the South Korean manufacturer Hyundai since 2004. In the brand's lineup, the Tucson is positioned below the Santa Fe, and above the Kona and Creta. It is named after the city of Tucson, Arizona. The second-generation model has been marketed as the Hyundai ix35 in several markets, including Europe, Australia and China, before reverting to Tucson for the third generation.

The Tucson is the best-selling Hyundai SUV model, with more than 7 million units sold globally since it launched in 2004. Of these, 1.4 million units have been sold in Europe.



First generation (JM; 2004) 

The first-generation Tucson was launched in 2004, after its name was announced in November 2003. Positioned as a smaller alternative to the Santa Fe, it shared its Hyundai Elantra-based platform with the second-generation Kia Sportage.

Markets

North America

In the U.S., the Tucson was offered in base GLS, mid-line SE, and top-tier Limited (formerly LX) trim levels for 2007 models. Earlier 2005 and 2006 models were offered as GL/GLS/Limited. Standard equipment included air conditioning, six airbags, electronic stability control, a CD player, alloy wheels, remote keyless entry, and premium cloth seats. The SE added to the roster with contrasting gray body cladding, a different alloy design, an AM/FM/Cassette/CD as well as fog lights and a front windshield wiper de-icing grid. The Limited added leather seating surfaces, a 6-disc in dash CD changer, body-colored cladding, automatic climate control, and heated seats. The GLS and Limited were only available with the 2.7 L V6. The GL came only with the 2.0-liter four-cylinder.

The Tucson offers modest cargo space but its easy-to-fold seats can expand this volume so they lie flat. Even the front passenger seat folds flat for extra-long cargo.

Safety
There are dual-stage frontal impact airbags, torso side-impact airbags built into the front seats, and curtain airbags for side-impact protection for front and rear passengers.

2009 Hyundai Tucson by the U.S. National Highway Traffic Safety Administration (NHTSA)
 Frontal Rating (Driver): 
 Frontal Rating (Passenger): 
 Side Rating (Driver): 
 Side Rating (Passenger):

Model year changes

Changes for 2006 were minimal. The LX became the Limited and got color-coded cladding, automatic climate control, and a high-performance sound system. The GLS retained the gray cladding but 'HYUNDAI' is no longer branded into the cladding on the front doors. The GLS also got improved cloth seats with the option of a heating element. Both GLS and Limited got redesigned alloy wheels. The base GL remained unchanged.

Changes for 2007 were also minimal. The GL and GLS trims were respectively renamed to GLS and SE to match the standard for all new Hyundai vehicles. The SE comes with a sport utility rack, has 4-wheel drive, and is a 6-cylinder engine.

2009 Tucsons saw minor restyling and trim changes.

Tucson FCEV

The Tucson Fuel Cell Electric Vehicle (FCEV) is a test fuel cell vehicle for Hyundai's second-generation hydrogen fuel cell. The vehicle includes an 80 kW electric motor by Enova Systems of Torrance, California, UTC Fuel Cells by South Windsor, Connecticut, 152V battery co-developed by Hyundai Motor Co. and LG Chem in Seoul, Korea,  hydrogen storage tanks developed by Dynetek Industries of Calgary, Alberta, Canada.

The vehicle was unveiled at the 2005 Los Angeles Auto Show and completed a  journey as part of the Hydrogen Road Tour in 2008.

Other markets

In Japan, the Hyundai Tucson was sold as the Hyundai JM until November 2009.  The Tucson was also sold in Europe, but not Euro NCAP tested.

A facelifted version of the first generation exclusive to China was produced by Beijing Hyundai. The second generation Tucson was renamed to ix35 in China and Brazil, and later became an independent model while the Tucson name returned with the introduction of the third generation.

Powertrain

Reception
The Hyundai Tucson received accolades from Canadian Car of the Year Best New Crossover award for 2005. It was named as one of the most reliable vehicles from the 2009 Consumer Reports reliability survey.

Safety
The first-generation Tucson in its standard European configuration received 4 stars for adult occupants, 3 stars for toddlers, and 1 star for pedestrians from Euro NCAP in 2006.

Second generation (LM; 2009) 

In most markets outside South Korea and North America, the Hyundai Tucson name (also known as the "Hyundai Tucson ix" in Korea) was retired in favor of Hyundai ix35. Vehicles sold in the North America and several other regions continued to be called Tucson.  The ix35 was unveiled at the 2009 Frankfurt Motor Show. The power output, fuel-efficiency, comfort and safety features were claimed to have been all upgraded. Known by the project name LM, it took 36 months and 280 billion won (approx. US$225 million) to develop.

The ix35's styling was reported to be based on Hyundai ix-onic concept. The ix35 was penned by Hyundai designer Cha Il-Hoei in 2007, under the guidance of former BMW designer Thomas Bürkle at Hyundai's Rüsselsheim design studio in Germany and continues the company's styling language, marketed as "fluidic sculpture". The compact crossover vehicle has sweeping coupe-like lines, a premium vehicle feel and comes with features unavailable on its predecessor.

Facelift 
The facelifted Tucson was released in South Korea on 2 May 2013, based on the European market ix35 styling with new grille, projector headlights, tail lights, rounded fog lights and front bumper. This facelift was also released in China in August 2013 under the ix35 nameplate, and was not applied in most markets outside South Korea and China, especially in Europe, where only headlights and tail lights were changed, and in North America and Australia, where it retained the pre-facelift styling with only headlights were changed. While in Indonesia, the Tucson received its own facelift in April 2014 based on the global model styling with new grille (similar to the South Korean and Chinese markets), projector headlights, tail lights and fog lights.

Markets

United States 

The Tucson sold in the United States came in three trims: GL, GLS and Limited, with All-Wheel Drive available for GLS and Limited trims. The GL comes with a standard manual transmission, but a 6-speed automatic transmission is available and is standard on GLS and Limited. The North American version uses a different gauge cluster design than the Korean version.

The 2011 Tucson offered in the U.S. a new GL trim which replaces the 2010 GLS model as Tucson's base trim. The GL is powered by a new 2.0-liter 4-cylinder engine mated to either a five-speed manual or an available six-speed automatic transmission in order to obtain better fuel economy than the 2.4-liter engine. The 2011 GLS trim includes the features of the 2010 "Popular Equipment Package" and an automatic transmission as standard equipment. Limited models now include standard electrochromatic mirrors with Homelink and has received Sachs dampeners to provide a smoother ride. The electronic stability control and motor driven power steering systems have been enhanced for improved performance. All AWD models now receive standard heated seats.

2014 model Tucson for North America have been upgraded with GDI direct injected Theta II engines that obtain more power and better emissions, LED tail/head lights, more stylish alloy rim designs, and a few minor improvements to the interior/audio system.

Australia 
In Australia, the ix35 is available in Active, Elite and Highlander trim levels. The 2.0-liter Theta II petrol engine in front-wheel drive is available on Active and Elite trims, while the 2.4-liter Theta II petrol engine and the 2.0-liter R-series diesel engine are available on Elite and Highlander trims.

Europe 
The European market ix35 has a restyled grille, front bumper, rounded fog lights and projector headlights, to differentiate it with global models. This styling was also sold in Malaysia from November 2012 as the Tucson.

In the United Kingdom, the ix35 was initially available in Style and Premium trim levels. It received an update in September 2013 with new headlights and tail lights, and is available in S, SE and Premium trim levels.

China 

In China, the first generation Tucson was sold alongside the ix35, which adopted the European market styling, and was replaced by the third-generation Tucson directly while the ix35 spawned its own successor, the Hyundai ix35 (NU). The ix35 NU was revealed on the 2017 Shanghai Auto Show in China and was available to the Chinese car market in the third quarter of 2017.

Powertrain 

The Tucson/ix35 is available with several engines: an all-new 2.0-litre diesel R engine, one of two Theta-II petrol engine variants (2.0-litre or 2.4-litre), 1.7-litre UII diesel and 1.6-litre Gamma GDI petrol. The later two only in Europe. The automatic transmission is Hyundai's all-new six-speed design. The manual transmissions available in Europe is a 6-speed for 1.7-litre and 2.0-litre diesels and 1.6 Gamma and a 5-speed for 2.0 Theta. In South Korea, the diesel engine is offered in both front-wheel drive and all-wheel drive configurations, while the 2.0-litre petrol engine is available only in front-wheel drive.

The North American versions are powered by either the 2.0-litre producing  or a 2.4-liter four-cylinder petrol engine producing  mated to the six-speed automatic transmission. The 2.4-litre engine makes almost the same power as the previous generation V6 engine while managing 20% better fuel economy than the previous generation four-cylinder.

Safety

The second-generation Hyundai Tucson earned 'Top Safety Pick' award from Insurance Institute for Highway Safety (IIHS) in the U.S.

Third generation (TL; 2015) 

In February 2015, Hyundai released the first details about its next-generation Tucson ahead of the crossover's official debut at the Geneva Motor Show on 3 March 2015. This model arrived in showrooms in the second half of 2015, as a 2016 model year. Since this generation, Hyundai abolished the ix35 nameplate, reverting back to Tucson globally.

The third-generation Tucson measures  longer and  wider than its predecessor, while riding on a  longer wheelbase. Rear storage space is also larger, with seats-up capacity growing from 465 to 513 litres.

Starting from this generation, safety technologies such as lane departure warning, blind spot detection, and auto braking for pedestrians and cars, along with a dual-clutch automatic transmission and torque vectoring known as Hyundai Active Cornering Control are offered.

Markets

North America 
Both engines are available in front and all-wheel drive versions. Available in July 2015, the 2016 Hyundai Tucson was available in four trim levels: SE, Eco, Sport and Limited.

Australia 
The Tucson was revealed in the country in August 2015. At launch, the Tucson was offered two petrol engines and one diesel, along with 6-speed manual, 6-speed auto and 7-speed dual-clutch auto transmissions. The 2.0-litre petrol engines include the 2.0-litre GDi Nu petrol engine, while it was also offered alongside the older 2.0-litre MPi version of the Nu engine. Other engines offered are the 1.6-litre T-GDi turbocharged petrol engine and a turbocharged 2.0-litre R-Series diesel engine. Models with the 2.0-litre GDi engine were sourced from South Korea, while the 2.0 MPi, 1.6 T-GDi and 2.0 R-Series variants were imported from the Czech Republic.

2018 facelift 
First shown at the 2018 New York International Auto Show, the Tucson for the 2019 model year received a facelift and significant changes to the powertrain options. Exterior updates included a new cascade grille, reshaped hood and tailgate design, rectangular fuel door, new rim designs, and an updated LED headlight design for higher trim levels. The interior received a major update to include a newly designed dash with lower centrally-placed air vents and a high-mounted head unit display.

In North America, the Driver Attention Warning (DAW) system is standard across all trim levels, and both the Lane Keeping Assist (LKA) departure/correction system and Front Collision Avoidance Assist (FCA) system are now also standard across all trim levels. The manual and dual clutch transmission options were dropped in favor of the 6-speed Shiftronic automatic used in the previous model.

In spring 2019, Hyundai started selling the sportier variant N-Line mainly in the European market.

2019 Chinese market facelift 
For the Chinese market, the Tucson was given an alternate facelift for the 2019 model year with the single model name known as 280TGDi and 6 separate trim levels. The 1.6-litre G4FJ engine is available paired to a 7-speed dual-clutch transmission.

Powertrain 
During the Geneva Motor Show, Hyundai also unveiled two concept variants, a Tucson hybrid electric and a diesel-powered plug-in hybrid. The 48V Hybrid combines a 2.0-liter diesel model with 134 hp (100 kW) and a six-speed manual transmission along with a 14 hp (10 kW) electric motor; combined system performance is 148 hp (110 kW) and 413 N·m (305 lb-ft) of torque. This boosts system power by 10% while emitting only 109 g/km . The concept plug-in-hybrid is also based on the all-new Tucson platform and is equipped with a 1.7-liter diesel engine and a seven-speed dual-clutch transmission. Combined system output is a maximum of 180 hp (135 kW) with 474 N·m (350 lb-ft) of torque, with estimated  emissions of less than 48 g/km.

Safety

Latin NCAP
The Korean-made third-generation Tucson in its most basic Latin American configuration with 2 airbags, UN127, and no ESC received 0 stars from Latin NCAP in 2021 (similar to Euro NCAP 2014).

Euro NCAP
The third-generation Tucson in its standard European configuration received 5 stars from Euro NCAP in 2015.

Fourth generation (NX4; 2020) 

The fourth-generation Tucson was revealed on 14 September 2020. The all-new model features Hyundai's "jewel-like" grille, with geometric daytime running lights integrated in its design. Hyundai's design team, led by SangYup Lee, its senior vice president and head of Hyundai Global Design Center, has reshaped the Tucson with bulging fenders, angled wheel wells, a level roofline and short overhangs. Prior to its release, the fourth-generation Tucson was previewed as the Vision T Concept showcased at the 2019 Los Angeles Auto Show in November 2019.

Riding on a shortened version of the N3 platform shared with the larger Santa Fe, the fourth-generation Tucson is offered with two wheelbase length for different markets to meet different customers needs and expectations in different regions, which are short-wheelbase, and long-wheelbase. Most regions outside Europe, Middle East and Mexico will receive the long-wheelbase version. In China, the long-wheelbase-only fourth-generation Tucson is marketed as the Tucson L to differentiate itself with the older model.

In the interior, the new Tucson features an optional hoodless fully digital instrument cluster and a four-spoke steering wheel. It also includes a vertically stacked, dual  full-touch screen with capacitive buttons.

Markets

Europe 
Continued to be produced at Hyundai Motor Manufacturing Czech, the European-market Tucson is solely offered with the short  wheelbase version. The European range of the fourth-generation Tucson includes five electrified powertrain options, as well as one petrol and one diesel.

Mild hybrid petrol models is fitted with the 6-speed Intelligent Manual Transmission (iMT) as standard.

The hybrid Tucson will be offered with a 6-speed automatic and optional all-wheel-drive drivetrain.

North America 
The fourth-generation Tucson was revealed for the North American market in November 2020 for the 2022 model year. The Tucson Hybrid is also sold in the region, bringing a combination of 1.6-litre T-GDi engine with a 44 kW electric motor. A plug-in hybrid version has also arrived, powered by a 13.8-kWh battery providing  of zero-emission range.

Despite resistance from the labor union in South Korea, Hyundai started to produce the new Tucson in the United States due to its increasing popularity from February 2021. It is produced alongside the Elantra, Sonata and Santa Fe and Santa Cruz in Hyundai Motor Manufacturing Alabama in Montgomery.

South Korea 
The fourth-generation Tucson was released in South Korea in September 2020. The range includes the 2.5-liter petrol engine, 1.6-liter TGDi petrol, 2.0-litre diesel, 1.6-litre hybrid or 1.6-litre plug-in hybrid.

China 
The fourth-generation Tucson was unveiled at the 2020 Guangzhou Motor Show, marketed as the Tucson L. Several exterior changes for the Chinese market include false exhaust tips in the rear. Changes in the interior include a larger vertically mounted touch screen infotainment system. A Smartstream turbocharged engine is offered, which is a 1.5-liter T-GDi engine that produces , paired with a 7-speed dual-clutch transmission.

Vietnam 
The fourth-generation Tucson was introduced in the country on 27 December 2021. It is offered in four grade levels, it uses the 2.0-litre petrol engine paired with 6-speed automatic on Standard and Premium grades, the 2.0-litre diesel engine paired with 8-speed automatic on Premium grade, while the Signature grade gets the Smartstream G 1.6-litre T-GDi engine paired with 7-speed DCT.

Philippines 
The fourth-generation Tucson was introduced in the Philippines on 20 June 2022 and it became available on dealerships on 17 August 2022 and is offered in GLS (6-speed automatic) and top-spec GLS+ (8-speed automatic). The 2.0-litre petrol engine is offered for the GLS, while the D 2.0-litre diesel engine is offered for the GLS+ grade.

Powertrain

Safety 
The Latin American Tucson has ventilated front disc brakes and solid ones in the rear.

Latin NCAP
The Eurasian-made fourth-generation Tucson in its most basic Latin American configuration with 2 airbags, UN127, and no ESC received 0 stars from Latin NCAP in 2022 (similar to Euro NCAP 2014).

The updated Eurasian-made fourth-generation Tucson in its most basic Latin American configuration with 6 airbags, UN127, ESC, and ISA received 3 stars from Latin NCAP in 2022.

Euro NCAP
The fourth-generation Tucson in its standard European configuration received 5 stars from Euro NCAP in 2021.

IIHS
The 2022 Tucson was tested by the IIHS and it received a Top Safety Pick+ award:

Sales

References

External links

 (Hyundai N - N-Line)

2010s cars
All-wheel-drive vehicles
Cars introduced in 2004
Compact sport utility vehicles
Crossover sport utility vehicles
Front-wheel-drive vehicles
Euro NCAP small off-road
Latin NCAP small off-road
Tucson